This page lists board and card games, wargames, miniatures games, and tabletop role-playing games published in 2021.  For video games, see 2021 in video gaming.

Games released or invented in 2021

Game awards given in 2021

Significant games-related events in 2021

Deaths

See also
List of game manufacturers
2021 in video gaming

References

Games
Games by year